BLHS may refer to:
 Ben Lomond High School, Ogden, Utah, United States
 Betsy Layne High School, Betsy Layne, Kentucky, United States
 Bishop LeBlond High School, St. Joseph, Missouri, United States
 Bishop Luers High School, Fort Wayne, Indiana, United States
 Bushwick Leaders High School for Academic Excellence, New York, New York, United States
 Bishop Lynch High School, Dallas, Texas, United States